The Jacob Highbarger House was built circa 1832 in Sharpsburg, Maryland, United States. The Greek Revival-influenced house is a late example of limestone construction in the Cumberland Valley of  Maryland, with an attached log workshop. The log structure is an unusual example of corner-post log construction with diagonal bracing.

It was listed on the National Register of Historic Places in 2002.

References

External links
, including photo in 2005, at Maryland Historical Trust

Houses on the National Register of Historic Places in Maryland
Houses completed in 1832
Houses in Washington County, Maryland
National Register of Historic Places in Washington County, Maryland
1832 establishments in Maryland